Ellen Santana (born 13 May 1998) is a Brazilian judoka.

She won a medal at the 2019 World Judo Championships.

References

External links
 
 

1998 births
Living people
Brazilian female judoka
20th-century Brazilian women
21st-century Brazilian women